

Medieval nobility 
 Branko Mladenović, Serbian magnate
 Vuk Branković, medieval Serbian nobleman
 Dejan, medieval Serbian nobleman
 Constantine Dragaš, medieval Serbian nobleman
 Jovan Dragaš, medieval Serbian nobleman
 Grgur Golubić, medieval Serbian nobleman
 King Vukašin, medieval Serbian king (1365-1371)
 King Marko, medieval Serbian king (1371-1395)
 Jovan Oliver, medieval Serbian nobleman
 Paskač, medieval Serbian nobleman
 Vlatko Paskačić, medieval Serbian nobleman
 Ostoja Rajaković, medieval Serbian nobleman
 Nikola Stanjević, medieval Serbian nobleman

Churchmen 
 Mihailo Bojčić, metropolitan of Kratovo
 Maksim I, Serbian Patriarch (1655-1672)
 Jefrem Janković Tetovac, Orthodox bishop 
 Atanasije II Gavrilović, Serbian Patriarch (1747-1752)
 Zaharija Dečanac, Metropolitan of Raška and Prizren (1819-1830)
 Dositej Novaković, Orthodox bishop of Timok
 Dimitrije Mladenović, Ecumenical Patriarchate of Constantinople Protoiereus in the Kumanovo kaza

Artists

Visual arts 
 Josif Mihajlović Jurukovski, architect and politician
 Petar Popović, architect 
 Jovan of Kratovo, 16th century illuminator
 Kosta Bradić, painter
 Đorđe Ilić, painter
 Radomir Reljić, painter
 Ljubica Sokić, painter
 Mladen Srbinović, painter
 Siniša Vuković, painter
 Olga Jančić, sculptor
 Vida Jocić, sculptor

Performing arts
Film
Dragomir Felba, actor
Predrag Laković, actor
Dragan Laković, actor
Slobodan Aligrudić, actor
Ljubiša Samardžić, actor
Ljubomir Ćipranić, actor
 Nataša Petrović, actress

Music
 Isaiah the Serb, 15th century composer
 Mara Đorđević, Serbian singer
 Maja Odžaklievska, Serbian singer, born in Skopje
 Beti Đorđević, Serbian singer, born in Kumanovo
 Tijana Dapčević, Serbian singer, born in Skopje, Serb mother, Eurovision participant
 Tamara Todevska, Macedonian singer, born in Skopje, Serb mother, Eurovision participant
 Dragan Vučić, Macedonian composer
 Martin Vučić, Macedonian singer, born in Skopje, Eurovision participant
 Barbara Popović, Macedonian singer, Junior Eurovision participant
Martija Stanojković, Macedonian and Serbian singer, Junior Eurovision participant

Literature 
 Stanislav of Lesnovo, 14th century writer
 Dimitar of Kratovo, 15th century writer and lexicographer
 Kosta Abrašević, Serbian poet 
 Andjelko Krstić, writer 
 Irena Arsić, literary historian
 Haralampije Polenaković, literary historian
 Petar Džadžić, literary critic

Scientists 
 Stevan Simić, geographer
 Tomo Smiljanić Bradina, ethnographer and writer 
 Jovan Trifunovski, geographer and anthropologist
 Traian Stoianovich, historian
 Dragoslav Avramović, economist
 Aleksandar Mladenović, linguist
 Ljubomir Maksimović, historian
 Vladimir Stojančević, historian
 Ksenofon Šahović, physician
 Milan Damnjanović, physicist
 Vladimir Kanjuh,  cardiovascular pathologist, professor of pathology and cardiovascular pathology
 Rastislav Marić, archaeologist and historian
 Borislav Jovanović, archaeologist

Politicians 
 Petar Novaković Čardaklija, diplomat in the First Serbian Uprising
 Vasilije Jovanović, founder of the Chetnik movement, interwar minister
 Spiro Hadži Ristić, mayor of Skopje
 Dušan Cekić, mayor of Skopje
 Josif Mihajlović Jurukovski, mayor of Skopje 
 Ilija Šumenković, interwar minister and ambassador
Ivan Stoilković, politician and president of the Democratic Party of Serbs in Macedonia

Military 
Serbian Revolution
 Cincar Janko Popović, duke in the First Serbian Uprising 
 Cincar Marko Kostić, duke in the First Serbian Uprising
 Vučo Žikić, notable figure in the First Serbian Uprising

Rebels
Velika Begovica, female rebel in the Kozjak region active during the Serbo-Turkish War (1876–78)
Zdravko Trajković-Dimitrijević (born ca. 1850, fl. 1876–80), known as Davče, was a Serbian soldier and rebel leader in Old Serbia and northern Macedonia. He hailed from Kumanovo. He participated in the Serbian–Ottoman War (1876–78), and after the war fought in various rebel bands throughout Old Serbia and Macedonia against the Ottomans. He was among the 65 signatories of the 1880 appeal to Serbia to aid in a rebellion in Macedonia. He was part of Spiro Crne's band during the Brsjak Revolt.

Kingdom of Serbia
 Lazar Petrović, Serbian general and adjutant of King Aleksandar Obrenović

Guerilla fighters in Macedonian struggle under Ottomans
Jovan Babunski, Chetnik guerrilla
Gligor Sokolović, Chetnik guerrilla
Micko Krstić, Chetnik guerrilla
Ditko Aleksić, Chetnik guerrilla
Đorđe Cvetković, Chetnik guerrilla
Jovan Dolgač, Chetnik guerrilla
Jovan Dovezenski, Chetnik guerrilla
Petko Ilić, Chetnik guerrilla
Petar Kacarević, Chetnik guerrilla
Todor Krstić-Algunjski, Chetnik guerrilla
Cene Marković, Chetnik guerrilla
Doksim Mihailović, Chetnik guerrilla
Pavle Mladenović, Chetnik guerrilla
Stevan Nedić-Ćela, Chetnik guerrilla
Spasa Garda, Chetnik guerrilla
Zafir Premčević, Chetnik guerrilla
Trenko Rujanović, Chetnik guerrilla
Boško Virjanac, Chetnik guerrilla
Rista Cvetković-Božinče, Chetnik guerrilla

World War II
Vera Jocić, Yugoslav Partisan
Milivoje Trbić, guerilla fighter

Sports 

 Aleksa Amanović, Serbian born, Macedonian football player
 Saša Ćirić, football player
 Miroslav Đokić, football player
 Darko Glišić, football player
 Rudi Gusnić, football player
 Saša Ilić, football player
 Stanoje Jocić, Serbian football player and a Yugoslav international
 Petar Krstić, football player
 Miljan Miljanić, football manager
 Ljubodrag Milošević, former football player, football coach
 Veljko Paunović, retired football player and football manager
 Milovan Petrović, Macedonian footballer 
 Predrag Ranđelović, Serbian born, Macedonian football player
 Stevica Ristić, naturalized Macedonian footballer married to a Macedonian women
 Dušan Savić, football player
 Kuzman Sotirović, the first footballer from Macedonia to play in Yugoslav national team
 Goran Stanić, football player
 Vujadin Stanojković, football player
 Ostoja Stjepanović, football player
 Dejan Stojanović, Austrian born Macedonian Serb footballer
 Nikola Stojanović, football player
 Dragoslav Šekularac, football legend of Red Star Belgrade, born in Štip
 Blagoje Vidinić, football player
 Jelena Antić, basketball player
 Pero Antić, basketball player 
 Ivica Blagojević, basketball player
 Miroslav Despotović, basketball player
 Goran Dimitrijević, basketball player
 Nenad Dimitrijević, basketball player
 Marko Dujković, basketball player
 Stevan Gligorijević, basketball player
 Budimir Jolović, basketball player
 Lazar Lečić, basketball coach
 Dragan Lukovski, basketball player
 Ranko Mamuzić, basketball player
 Kristijan Manević, basketball player
 Dragan Milenković, basketball player
 Ivan Mišković, basketball player
 Marjan Mladenović, basketball player
 Boris Nešović, basketball player
 Petar Nikolić, basketball player
 Predrag Pajić, basketball player
 Aleksandar Petrović, basketball coach
 Darko Radulović, basketball player
 Emil Rajković, former professional basketball player and current coach
 Toni Simić, basketball player
 Boban Stajić, basketball player
 Srdjan Stanković, basketball player
 Uroš Vasiljević, basketball player
 Đorđe Vojnović, basketball player and coach
 Nenad Zivčević, basketball player
 Dragica Kresoja, handball player
 Vesna Milošević, handball player
 Savica Mrkić, handball player
 Nemanja Pribak, handball player
 Radoslav Stojanović, handball player
 Veselin Vuković, handball player and coach
 Goran Kasum, sports wrestler

Other 
 Dimitrije Pepić, 16th-century endower and benefactor from Kratovo
 Denko Krstić, merchant and activist
 Golub Janić, national worker and benefactor 
 Temko Popov, activist and national worker
 Despot Badžović, teacher and national worker
 Vanja Bulić, Serbian journalist and author
 Dragan Pavlović Latas, Macedonian journalist

By descent
Born in Serbia and elsewhere with Serbian origins from North Macedonia:
Miloš Biković, paternal descent from Berovo
Svetlana Bojković, paternal descent from Kumanovo
Aleksandar Cincar-Marković, politician, Minister of Foreign Affairs of the Kingdom of Yugoslavia
Dimitrije Cincar-Marković, politician, Prime Minister of the Kingdom of Serbia, army general, Chief of General Staff, professor of war history and strategy
Alexander Kačaniklić, Swedish football player, family hails from Čučer-Sandevo
Josif Tatić, actor, maternal descent from Skopje

See also
List of Serbs
List of Serbs of Bosnia and Herzegovina
List of Serbs of Croatia
List of Serbs of Montenegro
List of Serbs of Slovenia
List of Serbs of Albania

References

Sources

Macedonia
Serbs